was a JR East railway station located in Aoba-ku, Sendai, Japan.  Since May 2002, this station had not been operational.

History
On November 10, 1937, the station began operation as temporary stop.
On March 31, 1987, the station was reclassified as a seasonal station.
Since May 2002, trains have not stopped at this station.
The station was officially closed as of March 15, 2014 (March 14 being the last day).

Lines
Yatsumori Station was served by the Senzan Line, and was 30.8 rail kilometers from the terminus of the line at Sendai Station.

Station layout
Yatsumori Station had a single side platform serving traffic in both directions.

Surrounding area
Yatsumori Station was originally opened to serve the nearby Yatsumori Ski Resort. There are currently no houses or buildings within several hundred meters of the station.

References

Railway stations in Miyagi Prefecture
Railway stations in Sendai
Senzan Line
Railway stations in Japan opened in 1937
Railway stations closed in 2002
Railway stations closed in 2014
Defunct railway stations in Japan